Spring Bay Township is located in Woodford County, Illinois, United States. As of the 2010 census, its population was 2,643 and it contained 1,133 housing units.

Geography

Demographics

References

External links
City-data.com
Illinois State Archives

Townships in Woodford County, Illinois
Peoria metropolitan area, Illinois
Townships in Illinois